SP2 may refer to:
 SP2 Life - Raw Fresh Spirulina producer - sp2life.com
 The University of Pennsylvania School of Social Policy and Practice, nicknamed SP2
 Spider-Man 2
 sp² bond, any bond which involves a sp² orbital
 Sp2 transcription factor, a human gene
 Honda VTR1000 SP-2, known as the RC51 in some markets, a 1000cc V-twin sports motorcycle produced between 2000 and 2006.
 i-mate SP2, the second smartphone model released by i-mate
 Savoia-Pomilio SP.2, a reconnaissance and bomber aircraft built in Italy during the First World War
 USS Lynx (SP-2), armed motorboat that served in the United States Navy as a patrol vessel and aviation support craft from 1917 to 1919
 Vektor SP1/SP2, a pistol
 Volkswagen SP2, a sports car developed by Volkswagen do Brasil
 IBM Scalable POWERparallel, a supercomputer with a model called SP2
 SuperPower 2, a real-time strategy game
 Service pack 2, a collection of software updates
 a postal district in the SP postcode area in England
 a model of steam toy made by British manufacturer Mamod
 an abandoned sink in the Sima Pumacocha, a cave in Peru
 Steel Panthers 2: Modern Battles, a 1996 computer war game in the Steel Panthers series
 Surface Pro 2, a laplet by Microsoft